Ibtissam "Betty" Lachgar, also spelled Ibtissame (born in August 1975) is a Moroccan developmental psychologist, feminist, human rights activist, and LGBT advocate. She's the co-founder of the MALI Movement (Mouvement alternatif pour les libertés individuelles). She is one of the few openly atheist Moroccans.

Early life and education 
Born in August 1975, Ibtissam Lachgar studied in Lycée Descartes in the Moroccan capital Rabat, before moving to Paris to study clinical psychology, criminology and victimology. She is currently working on her thesis in psychoanalysis, in Paris.

Activism 
On 23 August 2009, along with her friend Zineb El Rhazoui, she co-founded the Mouvement alternatif pour les libertés individuelles (MALI), a movement to defend individual freedoms in Morocco. In Moroccan Arabic (Darija), mali also means "What's wrong with me?" or "What are you accusing me of?"; thus it constitutes a rhetorical question to opponents of freedom, telling them to mind their own business.

2009 Ramadan Picnic 

The day after Mali's foundation, Lachgar and El Rhazoui announced their first event on their Facebook page: a daytime symbolic picnic (pique-nique symbolique) during the month of Ramadan, as a protest against the 222 article of the Moroccan penal code that punishes those who break the Islamic holy month's mandatory daytime fast. Participants were not obliged to eat; they could also simply show up to support of those who wanted to exercise their right to do so. The picnickers planned to meet at 13:00 on 13 September 2009 at the train station of Mohammedia, halfway between Casablanca and the capital city of Rabat; they would then proceed to the edge of a quiet forest on Mohammedia's outskirts. They argued that Article 222 only prohibited "ostentatively breaking the fast" in public, but that they would disturb no one when lunching in a public yet isolated place. Aside from many supportive messages, the online announcement also quickly attracted hostility from Islamists, who posted insults and death threats against the participants, such as: "We know how you look. We'll cut your throats." Several anti-Mali Facebook groups were created in opposition to the initiative. El Rhazoui said that even if they were attacked by Islamists or arrested by the police, it would show the world 'the fascism of Ramadan, if people who do such an innocent thing as picknicking in a forest were lynched by Islamists' or 'that in Morocco, you are already put behind bars for eating a sandwich'.

Only six picknickers are known to have shown up. Yet, as they arrived to the train station, they were instantly accosted by a crowd of about 100 police officers and Auxiliaires, and many journalists who knew about the event on Facebook. The activists were repeatedly questioned, searched and harassed for an hour, while journalists tried to interview them. At 14:00, the police forced the six participants to enter the train to Casablanca under the guard of two policemen, putting an end to the intended protest. The weekly magazine TelQuel, published an editorial calling the fierce reaction a sign Morocco has lost its culture of tolerance. “In one generation our country has radically transformed,” it said. “It’s scary.” The picnic caused public outrage within the Moroccan society and opened debate about religious freedoms in the country.

Kiss-in in Rabat 

Ibtissam was also one of the organizers of the public kiss-in that took place on October 12, 2013, to support three teenagers arrested for posting a picture of themselves kissing on Facebook. The protesters were confronted by onlookers as they kissed and chanted "Long live love". The kissing case has sparked uproar online, with citizens protesting against what they see as creeping conservatism in the Muslim country long known for being relatively liberal and tolerant. 
In an interview with France 24 about the kiss-in, she said: “For us, the message got through. It was a success. There were couples and single people, and the couples were not embarrassed in public. Our message is that they are defending love, the freedom to love and kiss freely”

2012 abortion boat controversy 
On behalf of MALI, which seeks to legalise abortion, Lachgar invited Women on Waves' abortion boat, run by Dutch physician Rebecca Gomperts, to land in Morocco in early October 2012. The goal was to make a symbolic statement about the lack of sexual and reproductive health and rights for women in Morocco, many of whom have unwanted pregnancies, which may only be aborted when the woman's life is in danger, not in any other circumstances including rape. This resulted in 'between 600 and 800 illegal abortions every day, which kills 90 Moroccan women annually', Gomperts said. If possible, she intended to perform abortions for Moroccan women, as her boat was sailing under the Dutch flag and thus allowed to perform legal abortions on board. Lachgar was wary that Moroccan authorities might try to block the boat with military might, as happened years earlier in Portugal.

Indeed, on 4 October, a warship was sent to block the boat – and all other traffic – from entering the port of Smir, located between Tétouan and the Spanish enclave of Ceuta. Only then did Women on Waves reveal that the boat had already docked at the port days earlier as a 'pleasure yacht', after which the activists reached the port on 4 October on foot, embarked and unfurled their banners. The Moroccan authorities claimed that the boat was just a 'decoy', and that they had managed to halt the 'real' vessel, but it was actually the only boat WOW had deployed. In the morning of 5 October, the boat was escorted out of the port into international waters by the Moroccan navy. This was the first time Women on Waves made landfall in a Muslim-majority country. Anti-abortion protesters were present, many carrying signs against abortion. The action, which was greeted by some and condemned by others, created a lot of controversy in Morocco, and stirred up heated debates. In May 2015, King Mohammed VI of Morocco decided to allow women to terminate their pregnancies if these were the result of rape or incest, or if the foetus was malformed.

LGBT+ and pro-choice advocacy 
Lachgar is also very vocal about the LGBT community in Morocco, and is pro-choice and pro same-sex marriage.

In January 2019, she was spokesperson for the support network for Chafiq, a Moroccan transvestite whose identity was publicly revealed by the police in Marrakech.

Personal life 
Ibtissam lives with her boyfriend in Rabat. He is also an atheist.

References 

1975 births
Anti-Islam sentiment in Morocco
Anti-pornography feminists
Anti-prostitution feminists
Former Muslim critics of Islam
Moroccan LGBT rights activists
Living people
Moroccan atheists
Moroccan former Muslims
Moroccan feminists
Moroccan human rights activists
Moroccan secularists
Radical feminists
Controversies in Morocco